William C. Morris may refer to:

William Case Morris (1864–1932), English pastor and social activist in Argentina
William Charles Morris (1874–1940), American cartoonist
William C. Morris, American publisher and namesake of the William C. Morris Award
William C. Morris, Buenos Aires, a town named after William Case Morris

See also
William Morris (disambiguation)